Rahul Bhatt (born 24 January 1982) is an Indian fitness trainer and actor. The son of film director Mahesh Bhatt and Kiran Bhatt, Rahul gained notoriety in 2009 following revelations that David Headley, an accused in the 2008 Mumbai attacks, had befriended him and they were close friends. In an investigative report by PBS, Rahul Bhatt was described as a B-movie actor asking for favours to reveal more details about Headley. He was a contestant on Bigg Boss 4 in 2010.

Biography
Rahul is the only son of Mahesh Bhatt and Kiran Bhatt (born Loraine Bright). On his father's side, Bhatt is of predominantly Gujarati descent and on his mother's side, he is of English, Scottish, Armenian, and Burmese ancestry and Rahul is the younger brother of actress Pooja Bhatt. Rahul weighed 122 kilograms before he began working out. He thanks his fitness mentor Kaizzad Capadia. Rahul's father planned to launch him in 2007 with the film Suicide Bomber to be directed by Anurag Basu.

In September 2010, Rahul became part of the Indian television reality show, Bigg Boss 4, hosted by Salman Khan. After being evicted from the house, he claimed that the show was scripted.

Association with David Headley
In September 2008, Rahul Bhatt and friend Vilas Varak met David Headley at a Mumbai gym. Even after the 26/11 attacks, they were continuously in touch, with Headley writing to Rahul an email in which he said he would soon be visiting them again. According to Headley's testimony, he was fond of Bhatt. He claims to have warned Bhatt not to visit South Mumbai area on 26 November, the day the Mumbai attacks started.

Television

References

Living people
Exercise instructors
Male actors from Mumbai
Rahul
Bigg Boss (Hindi TV series) contestants
Gujarati people
Indian people of Armenian descent
Indian people of Burmese descent
Indian people of English descent
Indian people of Scottish descent
1982 births